Bryansk Machine-Building Plant is a company based in Bryansk, Russia and established in 1873. It is part of Transmashholding.

The Bryansk Machine-Building Plant is the oldest builder of transportation equipment in Russia. It produces diesel locomotives, marine diesel engines (diesel B&W licensed), and specialized railroad equipment such as five-car refrigerator trains.

References

External links
 Official website

Rail vehicle manufacturers of Russia
Diesel engine manufacturers
Marine engine manufacturers
Companies based in Bryansk Oblast
Transmashholding
Companies established in 1873
Ministry of Heavy and Transport Machine-Building (Soviet Union)
Manufacturing companies of the Soviet Union
Companies nationalised by the Soviet Union
Engine manufacturers of Russia